Pathhead village is a conservation area in Midlothian, Scotland.

Location
It lies above the east bank of the River Tyne. The name of the village is due to its position. The A68 road is the main route through the village. With the opening of the Dalkeith bypass in 2008, it is possible to travel to Edinburgh in 10–15 minutes.

Historic buildings
 is a five-arch stone bridge carrying the A68 road over the Tyne Water at the north west entrance to the village. It was built in 1827–1831 to the designs of engineer Thomas Telford, and is a Category A listed building.

To the north of the village is Preston Hall, an 18th-century country house designed by William Adam for the Duchess of Gordon, and later rebuilt by Robert Mitchell for Alexander Callander, whose descendants still occupy the house.

On the opposite side of the Tyne Water is Oxenfoord Castle, originally a 16th-century tower house belonging to the MakGill Viscount of Oxfuird, which was greatly extended in a castellated style by Robert Adam, and further modified by William Burn for the Earl of Stair.

West of Pathhead is Vogrie Country Park, centred on the 19th-century Vogrie House, by architect Andrew Heiton.  The park is extensive and very popular, particularly around the summer months. It also features a 9-hole golf course. The estate also includes the 17th century Dowery House.

 south west of the village lies Crichton Castle. The castle was occupied from the late 14th century through to the close of the 16th century. It was the home of the influential Crichton family, and then passed to the Hepburn Earls of Bothwell, one of whom was the third husband of Mary, Queen of Scots. After Bothwell's fall, the castle was owned by Francis Stewart, who added the remarkable Italian-influenced north range. Golden retriever dog walking competitions are held annually beside the castle's parish.

Amenities
The village has a post office, pub, bakery, drop in centre, doctors surgery, pharmacy and fish and pizza takeaway. There is also a park on the west side of the village which has a full-size football pitch, pavilion building and children's play area.  In the newly built primary school (linking local primary schools together) has a 4G astroturf pitch which is located at the north west part of the village. Just off the Main Street there is a Roman Catholic church, St. Mary's. 1 mile south of the village lies the Church of Scotland Parish Church of Cranston, Midlothian.

There is a pub in the village which has been there since 1758.

Public transport
An hourly bus service run by Borders Buses links the village with Edinburgh, via Dalkeith and Edgehead. The trip takes around 45 minutes. The number 51 continues south to St Boswells.

Education
At the north west side of the village lies the new Tynewater Primary and Nursery schools, replacing the existing Pathhead Primary and Nursery schools on the south side of the village. Many children also attend St. David's RC Primary School in Dalkeith. Most children go on to attend either St. David's RC High School or Dalkeith High School, both located in Dalkeith.

References

External links

Vision of Britain - History of Pathhead in Midlothian

Villages in Midlothian